Euonyma curtissima is a species of small tropical air-breathing land snail, terrestrial pulmonate gastropod mollusk in the family Achatinidae. This species is endemic to Kenya.

References 

curtissima
Endemic molluscs of Kenya
Taxonomy articles created by Polbot